Wang Keping is philosophy professor and PhD supervisor of Beijing International Studies University (BISU), China.
He is also Director and doctoral supervisor at the Institute of Philosophy of the Chinese Academy of Social Sciences (CASS).
He enjoys the Chinese State Council Special Allowance since 1998 and is currently Vice President of the International Society for Universal Dialogue (ISUD).
He has been honorary member of the Olympic Center for Philosophy and Culture under the University of Athens since 2007.

Awards
Wang is a holder of British Academy K. C. Wong Fellowship and his major academic interest is in Aesthetics and Transcultural Studies.

 2004 — his Towards a Transcultural Aesthetics won the Beijing Book Prize
 2008 — titled Outstanding Contribution to the Philosophy and Dialogue of Peace at the World Congress of Philosophy, Seoul
 2010 — Jacobson Award for Outstanding Contribution to the International Philosophical Dialogue
 2010 — his Diversity and Universality in Aesthetics was elected the annual Yearbook of the International Association for Aesthetics

Publications 
As of 2011, his major English works include:
 The Classic of the Dao: A New Investigation. Beijing: Foreign Languages Press, 1998.
 Chinese Philosophy on Life. Beijing: Foreign Languages Press, 2005.
 Ethos of Chinese Culture. Beijing: Foreign Languages Press, 2007.
 Spirit of Chinese Poetics. Beijing: Foreign Languages Press, 2008.
 Chinese Way of Thinking. Shanghai: Brilliant Books, 2009.
 Reading the Dao: A Thematic Inquiry. London: Continuum International Publishing Group, 2011.

References 

Philosophers of art
Beijing International Studies University people
1955 births
Living people